Encyklopedia Powszechna (Universal Encyclopedia, Orgelbrand's Encyclopedia) published by Samuel Orgelbrand in 1859–1868 was one of the first modern Polish encyclopedias.

History
This encyclopedia is often called the first modern Polish encyclopedia (that is also universal and multi-volume). The title of the first Polish encyclopedia is also claimed by older works, e.g. Inventores rerum by Jan Protasowicz encyclopedia from 1608, Encyclopaedia Natvralis Entis by Stanisław Stokowski from 1637 and the Nowe Ateny from 1745.

Universal Encyclopedia was published in Warsaw in Congress Poland - the Polish territory of the Russian partition. Its content was censored by the official tsarist censorship. Later resumes of the first edition of the years (1872-1876, 1877–1879, 1883–1884, 1898–1904) had a volume-reduced form. In 1984–1985, a reprint of the original version was published in Poland.

The creators of the publication's content were many representatives of the Polish nineteenth-century intelligentsia. In entry to the first volume published in 1859, a list of authors of the encyclopedia has been published. It contained the following names:
 
 Adam Adamowicz
 Jerzy Alexandrowicz
 Władysław Ludwik Anczyc
 Michał Baliński
 Jan Baranowski
 Sadok Barącz
 Adam Bartoszewicz
 Julian Bartoszewicz
 Władysław Bentkowski
 Feliks Berdau
 Leopold Berkiewicz
 Cezary Biernacki
 Julian Bleszyński
 Kazimierz Bujnicki
 Ignacy Chodźko
 Teofil Cichocki
 Wojciech Cybulski
 Wincenty Dawid
 Walenty Dutkiewicz
 Ewa Felińska
 Zenon Fisz
 Henryk Flatau
 Antoni Funkenstein
 Józef Grajnert
 Jan Kanty Gregorowicz
 Leopold Hubert
 Kazimierz Jarochowski
 Jan Jasiński
 Ludwik Jenike
 Adam Jocher
 Karol Jurkiewicz
 Karol Kaczkowski
 Zygmunt Kaczkowski
 Kazimierz Kaszewski
 Adam Kirkor
 Oskar Kolberg
 Ludwik Kondratowicz
 Józef Korzeniowski
 Józef Kowalewski
 Rafał Krajewski
 Józef Ignacy Kraszewski
 Kajetan Kraszewski
 Józef Kremer
 Jan Kulesza
 Marceli Langowski
 Aleksander Lesser
 Franciszek Henryk Lewestam
 Karol Lilpop
 A. Lipnicki
 Hieronim Labęcki
 Józef Łepkowski
 Franciszek Maciejowski
 Józef Majer
 Franciszek Maciejowski
 Antoni Marcinkowski
 Józef Maczyński
 Adam Mieczyński
 Feliks Jan Szczęsny Morawski
 Antoni Morzycki
 August Mosbach
 Ludwik Neugebauer
 Otto Leopold
 Jan Pankiewicz
 Jan Papłoński
 Piotr Perkowski
 Nikodem Pęczarski
 Ludwik Pietrusiński
 Szymon Pisulewski
 Jan Feliks Piwarski
 Aleksander Połujański
 Józef Procki
 Adam Prażmowski
 Wincenty Prokopowicz
 Wincenty Przyałgowski
 Stanisław Przystański
 Alfons Puchewicz
 Ksawery Rakowski
 Antoni Rogalewicz
 Leon Rogulski
 Kazimierz Rogiński
 Paweł Rzewuski
 Walerian Serwatowski
 Hipolit Skimborowicz
 Fryderyk Skobel
 Franciszek Maksymilian Sobieszczański
 Leon Sokołowski
 Henryk Suchecki
 Wiktor Szokalski
 Wacław Sztulc
 Michał Szymanowski
 Michał Bohusz Szyszko
 Władysław Taczanowski
 Franciszek Wężyk
 Karol Widman
 Kazimierz Władysław Wóycicki
 Ludwik Wolski
 Antoni Wrotnowski
 Wincenty Wrześniowski
 Józef Wyszyński
 Gustaw Zieliński
 Feliks Żochowski

Content
It counted a total of 28 volumes, each of which had almost 1000 pages: 
 T.1 (A-Aos, 999 p.)
 T.2 (Ap-Bąk, 1088 p.)
 T.3 (B-Bol, 982 p.)
 T.4 (Bol-Cec, 984 p.)
 T.5 (C-Cul, 983 p.)
 T.6 (Cul-Den, 983 p.)
 T.7 (Den-Eck, 983 p.)
 T.8 (Eck-Flem, 983 p.)
 T.9 (Flem-Glin, 984 p.)
 T.10 (Glin-Guis, 983 p.)
 T.11 (Gui-Hof, 983 p.)
 T.12 (Hof-Jan, 983 p.)
 T.13 (Jan-Kapil, 983 p.)
 T.14 (Kapil-Kodeń, 983 p.)
 T.15 (Kodesz-Krasiń, 983 p.)
 T.16 (Krasiń-Libelt, 983 p.)
 T.17 (Libelt-Marek, 983 p.)
 T.18 (Maremmy-Mstów, 983 p.)
 T.19 (Msta-Optymaci, 983 p.)
 T.20 (Optymaci-Polk, 983 p.)
 T.21 (Polk-Realne szkoły i nauki, 983 p.)
 T.22 (Realne szkoły i nauki-Saski błękit, 983 p.)
 T.23 (Saski błękit-Starowiercy, 983 p.)
 T.24 (Starowiercy-Tarnogrodzka konfederacyja, 979 p.)
 T.25 (Tarnogrodzka konfederacyja-Uła, 983 p.)
 T.26 (Uła-Wikaryusz, 983 p.)
 T.27 (Wikaryusz-Wybrzeże, 983 p.)
 T.28 (Wybrzeże-Żyżmory, 1198 p.)

References

Bibliography
 

1859 books
Polish encyclopedias
19th-century encyclopedias